Scopula aetheomorpha is a moth of the family Geometridae. It was described by  Prout in 1917. It is found in Papua New Guinea.

References

Moths described in 1917
aetheomorpha
Endemic fauna of Papua New Guinea
Taxa named by Louis Beethoven Prout
Moths of New Guinea